Receptor-type tyrosine-protein phosphatase gamma is an enzyme that in humans is encoded by the PTPRG gene.

The protein encoded by this gene is a member of the protein tyrosine phosphatase (PTP) family. PTPs are known to be signaling molecules that regulate a variety of cellular processes including cell growth, differentiation, mitotic cycle, and oncogenic transformation. 

This PTP possesses an extracellular region, a single transmembrane region, and two tandem intracytoplasmic catalytic domains, and thus represents a receptor-type PTP. The extracellular region of this PTP contains a carbonic anhydrase-like (CAH) domain, which is also found in the extracellular region of PTPRBETA/ZETA. This gene is located in a chromosomal region that is frequently deleted in renal cell carcinoma and lung carcinoma, thus is thought to be a candidate tumor suppressor gene.

References

Further reading